Barbara Wysoczańska (née Szeja). (born 12 August 1949) is a Polish fencer. She won a bronze medal in the women's individual foil event at the 1980 Summer Olympics.

References

1949 births
Living people
Polish female fencers
Olympic fencers of Poland
Fencers at the 1976 Summer Olympics
Fencers at the 1980 Summer Olympics
Olympic bronze medalists for Poland
Olympic medalists in fencing
People from Świętochłowice
Medalists at the 1980 Summer Olympics
Sportspeople from Silesian Voivodeship
Barbara
20th-century Polish women
21st-century Polish women